Davletshinsky (Däwlätşa) is a rural locality (a village) in Zarechensky Selsoviet, Kugarchinsky District, Bashkortostan, Russia. The population was 32 as of 2010. There is 1 street.

Geography 
Davletshinsky is located 18 km northwest of Mrakovo (the district's administrative centre) by road. Voskresenskoye is the nearest rural locality.

References 

Rural localities in Kugarchinsky District